Cristina Cornejo Scheelje (born June 9, 1985, in Lima) is a Peruvian weightlifter. Cornejo represented Peru at the 2008 Summer Olympics in Beijing, where she competed in the women's super heavyweight category (+75 kg). She placed tenth in this event, as she successfully lifted 97 kg in the single-motion snatch, and hoisted 128 kg in a two-part, shoulder-to-overhead clean and jerk, for a total of 225 kg.

References

External links
NBC Olympics Profile

Peruvian female weightlifters
1985 births
Living people
Olympic weightlifters of Peru
Weightlifters at the 2008 Summer Olympics
Sportspeople from Lima
21st-century Peruvian women